Glenn Spencer (born May 1, 1964) is an American college football coach. He is currently the linebackers coach at Wake Forest University, a position he has held since 2022. Spencer previously served as the defensive coordinator and safeties coach at the University of South Florida. He played college football at Georgia Tech.

Early life and playing career
A native of Douglasville, Georgia, Spencer was a four-year letterman at Georgia Tech from 1982 to 1985, where he played defensive tackle. He earned a degree in management from Georgia Tech in 1987.

Coaching career

Early coaching career
Spencer began his coaching career at West Georgia, where he spent seven seasons as the linebackers coach, before being promoted to defensive coordinator in 1997. He was promoted to head coach in 1998, and spent 3 seasons as head coach of the Wolves, accumulating a 28–7 record, as well as two Gulf South Conference titles. Spencer was inducted into the West Georgia Hall of Fame in 2017.

Spencer was hired as an assistant coach at his alma mater Georgia Tech, where he spent his first season as the running backs coach before being shifted to the defensive line coach for two seasons. He left Georgia Tech to accept a position on former college teammate Ted Roof's inaugural staff at Duke.

Duke
Spencer was named the assistant head coach and defensive backs coach at Duke in 2004, where he also served as the team's recruiting coordinator. He spent the first three seasons as the defensive backs coach before being shifted to coach inside linebackers in 2007. Following the termination of Roof after the 2007 season, he was not retained by the next head coach David Cutcliffe.

Oklahoma State
Spencer was hired on Mike Gundy's coaching staff in 2008 to serve as the team's defensive line coach. He was shifted to coach linebackers in 2009, where he remained the linebackers coach for the rest of his tenure in Stillwater. He added co-defensive coordinator duties in addition to his linebackers coaching duties in 2011 before being named the defensive coordinator in 2013. Spencer was not retained by Oklahoma State after the 2017 season.

Charlotte 
Following his termination from Oklahoma State, Spencer was hired by Charlotte as the defensive coordinator and linebackers coach for the 2018 season. During his lone season at Charlotte, the 49ers only had a 5–7 record despite Spencer's defense being in the top 25 in terms of yards allowed. He left Charlotte after head coach Brad Lambert was fired and Will Healy was hired.

Florida Atlantic
Spencer was named to Lane Kiffin's staff at Florida Atlantic to serve as the defensive coordinator and linebackers coach for the 2019 season. Hours after Florida Atlantic's victory in their conference championship game, Kiffin departed Florida Atlantic to take the head coaching job at Ole Miss. Spencer was named the interim head coach for their bowl game against SMU. Despite the Florida Atlantic players lobbying for Spencer to be named the permanent head coach, former Florida State head coach Willie Taggart was named the team's new head coach.

South Florida
Spencer was named the defensive coordinator and linebackers coach for the South Florida football team, joining his counterpart, former Florida Atlantic offensive coordinator Charlie Weis Jr. on Jeff Scott's inaugural staff. He and Weis were both signed to three year deals--Spencer's salary was $500,000. On November 21st, 2021, Spencer was fired by head coach Jeff Scott after posting a bottom 10 defense in all of FBS for the 2021 season.

Wake Forest
In February of 2022, Spencer was hired as the linebackers coach for the Wake Forest Demon Deacons football team by head coach Dave Clawson.

Personal life
Spencer's wife, Angela, died in 2011 from heart disease. The couple had two sons, Luke and Abraham. Spencer and former ESPN reporter Jeannine Edwards were engaged on February 17, 2013, and were married on July 12, 2013.

Head coaching record

Notes

References

External links
 
 Wake Forest profile
 South Florida Bulls profile

1964 births
Living people
American football defensive tackles
Charlotte 49ers football coaches
Duke Blue Devils football coaches
Florida Atlantic Owls football coaches
Georgia Tech Yellow Jackets football coaches
Georgia Tech Yellow Jackets football players
Oklahoma State Cowboys football coaches
South Florida Bulls football coaches
Wake Forest Demon Deacons football coaches
West Georgia Wolves football coaches
People from Douglasville, Georgia
Sportspeople from the Atlanta metropolitan area
Coaches of American football from Georgia (U.S. state)
Players of American football from Georgia (U.S. state)